For information on all University of North Carolina Wilmington sports, see UNC Wilmington Seahawks

The UNC Wilmington Seahawks baseball team is a varsity intercollegiate athletic team of the University of North Carolina Wilmington in Wilmington, North Carolina, United States. The team is a member of Colonial Athletic Association, which is part of the National Collegiate Athletic Association's Division I. UNC Wilmington's first baseball team was fielded in 1957. The team plays its home games at Brooks Field in Wilmington, North Carolina. The Seahawks are coached by Randy Hood.

Seahawks in Major League Baseball
Since the Major League Baseball Draft began in 1965, UNC Wilmington has had 79 players selected.

See also
List of NCAA Division I baseball programs

References

External links
 

Sports clubs established in 1957